Events in the year 2008 in Gabon.

Incumbents 

 President: Omar Bongo Ondimba
 Prime Minister: Jean Eyeghé Ndong

Events 

 April 27 – 30 – Local elections were held in the country.

Deaths

References 

 
2000s in Gabon
Years of the 21st century in Gabon
Gabon